Hoskuld Dala-Kollsson (c. 910–965) was an Icelandic gothi or chieftain of the early Icelandic Commonwealth period. He was the son of Dala-Koll (Koll of the Dales) who has a fjörd named after him, and Thorgerd Thorsteinsdottir, daughter of Thorstein the Red. His father died when he was a child and his mother married a landowner named Herjolf, who became the father of Hoskuld's half-brother Hrútr Herjólfsson. Hoskuld was enormously influential in northwestern Iceland, particularly in the Laxardal region, and is one of the main characters of the first half of Laxdæla saga. By his wife Jorunn he was the father of Bard, Thorleik, and Hallgerd and the grandfather of Bolli Thorleiksson. By his Irish concubine Melkorka he was the father of Olaf the Peacock and possibly of another son named Helgi.

References
Ari the Learned. The Book of the Settlement of Iceland (Landnámabók). Ellwood, T., transl. Kendal: T. Wilson, Printer and Publisher, 1898.
Byock, Jesse. Viking Age Iceland. Penguin Books, 2001.
Forte, Angelo, Richard Oram and Frederik Pedersen. Viking Empires. Cambridge Univ. Press, 2005 .
Hollander, Lee, transl. Njal's Saga. Wordsworth, 1999.
Jones, Gwyn. A History of the Vikings. 2nd ed. London: Oxford Univ. Press, 1984.
Magnusson, Magnus and Hermann Palsson, transl. Laxdaela Saga. Penguin Classics, 1969.
Ordower, Henry. "Exploring the Literary Function of Law and Litigation in 'Njal's Saga.'" Cardozo Studies in Law and Literature, Vol. 3, No. 1 (Spring – Summer 1991), pp. 41–61.
Scudder, Bernard, transl. Egil's Saga. Penguin Classics, 2005.

10th-century Icelandic people
Year of birth unknown
Year of death unknown
Place of birth missing
Year of birth uncertain
Goðar